Urocortin-3 is a protein that in humans is encoded by the UCN3 gene.
It belongs to the corticotropin-releasing hormone family.

Function 

This gene is a member of the sauvagine/corticotropin-releasing factor/urotensin I family. It is structurally related to the corticotropin-releasing factor (CRF) gene and the encoded product is an endogenous ligand for CRF type 2 receptors. 

In the brain it may be responsible for the effects of stress on appetite. In humans, it is also expressed by alpha cells and beta cells in the pancreas and is co-released with glucagon and insulin to promote somatostatin release from neighboring delta cells, which provides negative feedback on glucagon and insulin secretion.  In spite of the gene family name similarity, the product of this gene has no sequence similarity to Urotensin-II.

References

Further reading